Ángela Molina Tejedor (born 5 October 1955) is a Spanish actress. Aside from her performances in Spanish films, she has starred in multiple international productions, particularly in a number of Italian films and television series.

Family
Molina was born in Madrid on 5 October 1955, the daughter of singer Antonio Molina and Ángela Tejedor. Another of her siblings, is a composer.

Career
She studied dance and theatre art in the Escuela Superior de Madrid. She made her film debut in 1975 with César Fernández Ardavín's No matarás. Another early major credit is her performance as Rosa (a sexually provocative woman and unwed mother) in Black Brood (1977), a film portraying fascist violence in post-Francoist Spain. She rose to international prominence after starring in Luis Buñuel's last film That Obscure Object of Desire (1977).

She has worked with such directors as Luis Buñuel, the Taviani brothers, Jaime Chávarri, Pedro Almodóvar, Fernando Colomo, Jaime Camino, José Luis Borau, Manuel Gutiérrez Aragón, Giuseppe Tornatore, Bigas Luna, Alain Tanner, Julio Medem, Ridley Scott, Lina Wertmüller, Sergio Castellitto and Jaime de Armiñán.

In 1985, she became the first foreign actress to win the Italian cinematographic David di Donatello prize for her role in Lina Wertmüller's Camorra. She was awarded the prize for Best Actress at the Donostia-San Sebastian International Film Festival in 1987 for her role in Half of Heaven. She was also repeatedly nominated for the Goya Awards (Spanish cinematographic awards).

In 1999, she was the Head of the Jury at the 49th Berlin International Film Festival.

She was awarded with the Gold Medal of Merit in the Fine Arts in 2002 and the Spanish  in 2016.

Selected filmography

Film

Other

 Tre giorni di Natale (2019)
 Nowhere (2002)
 Anna's Summer (2001)
 Sagitario (2001)
 Jara (2000)
 Daughter of Her Son (2000)
 Trouble in Love (1993)
 Poor Jorge (1993)
 A Woman in the Rain (1992)
 Krapatchouk (1992) 
 The Man Who Lost His Shadow (1991)
 Drums of Fire (1990)
 Black River (1990)
 The Savage (1989)
  (1985) 
 Dies rigorose Leben (1983)
 The Remains from the Shipwreck (1978)

Television

Awards and nominations

References

External links

 

1955 births
Living people
Actresses from Madrid
Spanish film actresses
David di Donatello winners
IFFI Best Actor (Female) winners
Spanish television actresses
20th-century Spanish actresses
21st-century Spanish actresses